Morgan is a neighborhood in Sayreville in Middlesex County, New Jersey, United States, named for Charles Morgan III who purchased the land on May 7, 1710.

The Morgan Draw, constructed over the Cheesequake Creek in 1912, serves the North Jersey Coast Line.

A month before the end of World War I in 1918, the neighborhood was heavily damaged by the T. A. Gillespie Company Shell Loading Plant explosion.

Morgan Heights is a neighborhood on the bluff in the district.

See also
List of neighborhoods in Sayreville, New Jersey

References

Neighborhoods in Sayreville, New Jersey